Baldwin Park Unified School District is a public school district based in Los Angeles County, California. The school district covers all of Baldwin Park and the southern portion of Irwindale. The Governing Board is composed of five members, elected at large, serving a four-year term. The elections are held on a Tuesday after the first Monday in November of even-numbered years effective with the 2018 election.

External links
 

School districts in Los Angeles County, California